Daniela Kix (born 4 May 1983) is a former Austrian tennis player.

Her career-high WTA rankings are 190 in singles, which she reached on 15 May 2006, and 341 in doubles, attained on 15 November 2004.
In her career, she won a total of five titles on tournaments of the ITF Circuit.

Kix qualified for the 2006 Bangalore Open and lost in the first round. She lost to Svetlana Kuznetsova in Moscow and Elena Baltacha in London.

ITF Circuit finals

Singles: 6 (3 titles, 3 runner-ups)

Doubles: 3 (2 titles, 1 runner-up)

References
 
 

Living people
Austrian female tennis players
1984 births
People from Stockerau
Sportspeople from Lower Austria